Crisinidae is a family of bryozoans belonging to the order Cyclostomatida.

Genera

Genera:
 Bicrisina d'Orbigny, 1853
 Biidmonea Calvet, 1903
 Bitubigera d'Orbigny, 1853

References

Cyclostomatida